Goggia lineata, also known as the striped dwarf leaf-toed gecko or striped pygmy gecko, is a minute and delicate species of dwarf leaf-toed gecko that is indigenous to the western part of the Cape of South Africa.

Geographic range
Its natural range extends from Cape Town (where it is sometimes still found in suburban gardens) eastwards through the Western Cape and then up along South Africa's west coast as far as Namibia.

Description

Behaviour and habitat
They can often be found sheltering under rubble or vegetation, alongside other species, being happy to share a refuge with other larger geckos such as Afrogecko porphyreus (the marbled leaf-toed gecko).

Diet
Collectively they eat a great deal of small insects such as ants and termites, helping to serve as a form of natural pest-control.

Threats
Domestic cats - as introduced predators - will usually kill large numbers of these little lizards, often exterminating them from the immediate area.

Reproduction
This species of dwarf leaf-toed gecko lays two tiny eggs in a moist, warm spot in summer.

References

Further reading
Boulenger GA. 1885. Catalogue of the Lizards in the British Museum (Natural History). Second Edition. Volume I. Geckonidæ, Eublepharidæ, Uroplatidæ, Pygopodidæ, Agamidæ. London: Trustees of the British Museum (Natural History). (Taylor and Francis, printers). xii + 436 pp. + Plates I-XXXII. (Phyllodactylus lineatus, pp. 92–93).
Branch, Bill. 2004. Field Guide to Snakes and Other Reptiles of Southern Africa. Third Revised edition. Second impression. Sanibel Island, Florida: Ralph Curtis Books. 399 pp. . (Goggia lineata, pp. 241–242 + Plate87).
Gray JE. 1838. "A new species of lizard and land shells from South Africa". pp. 268–269. In: Alexander JE. 1838. An Expedition of Discovery into the Interior of Africa, through the hitherto Undescribed Countries of the Great Namaquas, Boschmans, and Hill Daramas, Performed under the Auspices of Her Majesty's Government, and the Royal Geographical Society. Volume II, Appendix I. London: Henry Colburn. (Phyllodactylus lineatus, new species).

Goggia
Reptiles of South Africa
Reptiles described in 1838
Taxa named by John Edward Gray